Tetraiodonickelate is a complex ion of nickel with four iodide atoms [NiI4]2− arranged in a tetrahedron. [NiI4]2− is red in solution.  This colour is due to absorption around 530 nm and below 450 nm. Maximum light transmission is around 620 nm, which is red. A broad weak absorption in the near infrared is at 740 nm. The magnetic moment is anomalously low.

A mixture of lithium iodide and nickel iodide in water or methanol can partition NiI42− ions into a cyclohexane-amine mixture.  The solution formed is blood red.

History
Already in 1909 Cambi had noticed that a mixture of nickel iodide and sodium iodide dissolved in acetone has a red colour.  This red colour was due to the presence of tetraiodonickelate.

Salts
Bis-triphenylmethylarsonium tetraiodoronickelate [(C6H5)3CH3As]2NiI4 is red in colour. It can be made from triphenylmethylarsonium iodide and nickel iodide in hot ethanol. The red flakes that precipitate must be filtered before the alcohol cools, else the compound decomposes.

Bis(tetraethylammonium) tetraiodonickelate has a molecular weight of 826.8135 and a CAS number of 13927-28-1.

1,2,6-trimethyl-pyrazinium-tetraiodonickelate has CAS 88227-96-7.

References

Nickel complexes
Iodine compounds